Mosman was an electoral district of the Legislative Assembly in the Australian state of New South Wales, originally created in 1913 and named after and including the Sydney suburb of Mosman.  In 1920, with the introduction of proportional representation, it was absorbed into North Shore. Mosman was recreated in 1927 and abolished in 1991.

Members for Mosman

Election results

References

Former electoral districts of New South Wales
1913 establishments in Australia
Constituencies established in 1913
1920 disestablishments in Australia
Constituencies disestablished in 1920
1927 establishments in Australia
Constituencies established in 1927
1991 disestablishments in Australia
Constituencies disestablished in 1991